Sixten Johansson (25 January 1910 – 13 October 1991) was a Swedish ski jumper. He competed in the individual event at the 1936 Winter Olympics.

References

External links
 

1910 births
1991 deaths
Swedish male ski jumpers
Olympic ski jumpers of Sweden
Ski jumpers at the 1936 Winter Olympics
People from Boden Municipality
Sportspeople from Norrbotten County